Margarito Pomposo Barros (1910 – 11 November 2007) was a Mexican long-distance runner. He competed in the marathon at the 1932 Summer Olympics and finished 20th.

References

1910 births
2007 deaths
Athletes (track and field) at the 1932 Summer Olympics
Mexican male long-distance runners
Mexican male marathon runners
Olympic athletes of Mexico
Sportspeople from Puebla
20th-century Mexican people